SS Ben-my-Chree was an iron paddle-steamer of the Isle of Man Steam Packet Company and was the second vessel of the company to bear the name.

Description 
Ben-my-Chree was built by the Barrow Shipbuilding Company and launched at Barrow-in-Furness on 6 May 1875.

It was subsequently found that she operated two knots below her recorded top speed, despite modifications to her boilers. Reboilered in 1884, she was altered to carry four funnels, in pairs fore and aft of the paddle-boxes. This made her the only four-funnelled vessel in line's history.

After an uneventful 31-year career, Ben-my-Chree was sold for scrap and broken up at Morecambe, in 1906.

References

Bibliography

External links

Ships of the Isle of Man Steam Packet Company
1875 ships
Ferries of the Isle of Man
Four funnel liners
Steamships of the United Kingdom
Passenger ships of the United Kingdom
Ships built in Barrow-in-Furness
Steamships
Paddle steamers of the United Kingdom